Leon Lai Yi (born 29 November 1990), in Ganzhou, Jiangxi, China is a Chinese actor.

Career
In 2015, Lai debuted with a role in the action fantasy television series Armor Hero. The same year, he made his big-screen debut in the crime thriller The Witness playing a rookie police officer.

In 2017, Lai became known to the audience after starring in hit xianxia romance drama Eternal Love as Die Feng. The same year, he played his first leading role in the youth romance web series Hi Flower.

In 2018, Lai starred in wuxia drama The Flame's Daughter, playing an antagonist. The same year, he starred in fantasy drama Legend of Fuyao. Lai's role as the mysterious and cold medicine practitioner Zong Yue received much popularity from the audience, and led to increased popularity for the actor.

In 2019, Lai starred in the esports drama The King's Avatar as Bao Rongxing. The same year, he was cast as the male lead in the historical romance drama Jiu Liu Overlord.

Filmography

Film

Television series

References

1990 births
Living people
21st-century Chinese male actors
Male actors from Jiangxi
Beijing Film Academy alumni
Chinese male television actors
Chinese male film actors
Jay Walk Studio